Leonel Fernández (born 14 April 1934) is a Guatemalan former sports shooter. He competed in the 50 metre rifle three positions event at the 1968 Summer Olympics.

References

1934 births
Living people
Guatemalan male sport shooters
Olympic shooters of Guatemala
Shooters at the 1968 Summer Olympics
Sportspeople from Guatemala City